Papailoa Beach, otherwise known as Police Beach, is located on the north shore of the island of Oahu in the Hawaiian Islands.  It has gained notoriety as a prime filming location for the popular television show Lost.  The production crew changed locations from the original beach (Mokuleia Beach) after the winter surf encroached upon the set constructed for the camp scenes.

Beaches of Oahu
Lost (TV series)